The following are the winners of the César Award for Best Cinematography (French: César de la meilleure photographie).

Winners and nominees

1970s

1980s

1990s

2000s

2010s

2020s

See also
Lumières Award for Best Cinematography
Academy Award for Best Cinematography
BAFTA Award for Best Cinematography
Magritte Award for Best Cinematography

References

External links 
  
 César Award for Best Cinematography at AlloCiné

Cinematography
Awards for best cinematography